Embryonic coelom may refer to:

 Extra-embryonic coelom
 Intra-embryonic coelom